= Plano-convex =

Plano-convex may refer to:

- Plano-convex lens, in optics
- Plano-convex, a type of mudbrick used by the ancient Sumerians
